Mauro Luna Diale (born 26 April 1999) is an Argentine professional footballer who plays as a forward for Unión Santa Fe.

Career
Luna Diale's career started out in Boca Juniors' academy, he received call-ups to first-team friendlies including in January 2017 for a Torneo de Verano exhibition with Estudiantes. On 24 January 2019, Luna Diale was loaned to Uruguayan Primera División side Cerro Largo. His professional bow came in a 2–0 victory over Danubio on 17 February.

Career statistics
.

References

External links

1999 births
Living people
Sportspeople from Buenos Aires Province
Argentine footballers
Association football forwards
Argentine expatriate footballers
Expatriate footballers in Uruguay
Argentine expatriate sportspeople in Uruguay
Uruguayan Primera División players
Argentine Primera División players
Unión de Santa Fe footballers
Boca Juniors footballers
Cerro Largo F.C. players